Irshad Ali is Pakistan's most successful shooter having won three medals at the Commonwealth Games. He took part in his third Games in New Delhi, India.

Career
Ali is employed with Pakistan Navy.

Sportsman

Commonwealth Games
Ali took part in the 2002 Commonwealth Games in Manchester where he won two bronze medals, both in 25m centre fire pistol (singles and pairs) His third medal came at the 2006 Commonwealth Games in Melbourne, Australia where he won a silver in 25m standard pistol singles.

References

Living people
Shooters at the 2002 Commonwealth Games
Shooters at the 2006 Commonwealth Games
Shooters at the 2010 Commonwealth Games
Pakistani male sport shooters
Year of birth missing (living people)
Place of birth missing (living people)
Shooters at the 1998 Asian Games
Shooters at the 2002 Asian Games
Shooters at the 2006 Asian Games
Commonwealth Games medallists in shooting
Commonwealth Games silver medallists for Pakistan
Commonwealth Games bronze medallists for Pakistan
Asian Games competitors for Pakistan
Medallists at the 2002 Commonwealth Games
Medallists at the 2006 Commonwealth Games